Wanted by Scotland Yard is a 1937 or 1938 British crime film directed by Norman Lee and starring James Stephenson, Betty Lynne and Leslie Perrins. It was made at Welwyn Studios, and is sometimes known by the alternative title of Dangerous Fingers. Its year of release is often described as 1939, the year of its American distribution, but it had premiered in Britain earlier. When jewel thief Fingers (James Stephenson) recognises intended victim Standish (Leslie Perrins) as the man who caused the death of his girlfriend, his motivations switch from robbery to revenge.

Cast
 James Stephenson as Fingers  
 Betty Lynne as Doris 
 Leslie Perrins as Standish  
 Nadine March as Mabel  
 Sally Stewart as Molly  
 D. A. Clarke-Smith as Inspector Williams  
 George Merritt as Charlie 
 Bryan Herbert as Sherlock  
 Florence Groves as Maud  
 Philip Ray as Ben 
 Eric Pavitt as Boy

References

Bibliography

 Low, Rachael. Filmmaking in 1930s Britain. George Allen & Unwin, 1985.
 Wood, Linda. British Films, 1927-1939. British Film Institute, 1986.

External links

1938 films
British crime films
1930s crime films
1930s English-language films
Films directed by Norman Lee
Films set in England
Films shot at Welwyn Studios
British black-and-white films
1930s British films